Shewanella sediminis is a hexahydro-1,3,5-trinitro-1,3,5-triazine-degrading bacterium from marine sediment. It is psychrophilic and rod-shaped, with type strain HAW-EB3T (=NCIMB 14036T =DSM 17055T).

References

Further reading

External links
LPSN
Type strain of Shewanella sediminis at BacDive -  the Bacterial Diversity Metadatabase

Alteromonadales
Bacteria described in 2005
Psychrophiles